Daniel Lundh is a Franco-Swedish actor and writer.

Early life 

Daniel Lundh was born in Malmö, of a Swedish father and a French mother. His father, Lennart Lundh, is a fine-art dealer and former actor.

At the age of seven, the family moved to Paris, where he attended Montessori schooling. In addition to Swedish and French, he became fluent in English and Spanish.

After graduation, he moved to New York City to pursue theater studies at the Lee Strasberg Theater Institute. His teacher, Chad Burton, took him under his wing by allowing him to attend sessions at the mythical Actors Studio. He then trained at HB Studio with Salem Ludwig. Back in Paris, he studied for two years at Cours Florent, notably with Lesley Chatterley. He also regularly trained with Bela Grushka and Jordan Beswick C.S.A.

Thereafter, he left for London, where he remained for three years. He appeared in numerous fringe plays and series.

Career 
In 2006, he obtained his first film role in O Jerusalem, directed by Elie Chouraqui, alongside Ian Holm, JJ Feild and Patrick Bruel.

In 2007, he starred in Délice Paloma, by Nadir Mokneche, with co-stars Aylin Prandi and Biyouna. The film was a success and the actor received critical acclaim for his role as a troubled youth in search of his father. His performance earned him a nomination for the César for Most Promising Actor.

In 2008, he successively worked in House of Saddam, a BBC and HBO co-production on the life of Saddam Hussein, and Les Héritières, for France 3. The TV film, in two parts, is an adaptation of King Lear by Shakespeare, set in Corsica, with Jacques Weber, Amira Casar and Jean Benguigui. There, he played the role of Massimo, the bastard and vengeful son.

In 2010, he acted in 22 Bullets, a thriller about the Marseille mob, directed by Richard Berry, alongside Jean Reno, Kad Merad, Jean-Pierre Darroussin, and Marina Fois. The film was produced by EuropaCorp.

In 2011, he played Juan Belmonte in Woody Allen's Midnight in Paris.

In parallel to his acting career, he devotes himself to writing and music.

In 2017, he starred in Netflix's hit Spanish series, Morocco: Love in Times of War.

Filmography

References

External links
 
 Daniel Lundh: Un Comédien Lumineux. Paris 5eme, 6eme, 7eme - le bonbon 06/2011
 Paloma Delight, by Lisa Nesselson. Paloma Delight
 Hola. Daniel Lundh, de 'Tiempos de Guerra', enamorado también fuera de la ficción
 Vertele. Daniel Lundh, la sorpresa de Tiempos de guerra: "Plasmamos todas las caras de los seres humanos"
 20 Preguntas a Daniel Lundh, by Marivi Gonzales. Entrevistamos a Daniel Lundh, el famoso Larbi de Tiempos de Guerra

21st-century Swedish male actors